Osseo is the name of three places in the United States:

 Osseo, Michigan
 Osseo, Minnesota
 Osseo, Wisconsin